Single File is the debut studio album by American punk rock band The Honor System.

Track listing 
 "Nails" – 4:33
 "The Blaming Game" – 3:03
 "Saints" – 4:05
 "Decompose" – 3:55
 "Facelift" – 3:35
 "Flight" – 3:55
 "Fool's Gold" – 2:09
 "Muffled By Concrete" – 4:01
 "Sit Pretty" – 4:27
 "Wax Wings" – 4:51

Personnel 
 Dan Hanaway – vocals, guitar (right channel)
 Nolan McGuire – guitar (left channel)
 Chris Carr/Tim McIlrath – bass
 Rob DePaola – drums

2000 albums
Asian Man Records albums
The Honor System (band) albums
Albums produced by Matt Allison (record producer)